During the 1995–96 Scottish football season, Celtic competed in the Scottish Premier Division.

Season summary
Celtic lost only once in the league all season, but also drew eleven games and so they finished in second, four points off champions Rangers. As a result, Celtic qualified for the UEFA Cup.

Celtic had poor form in the cup competitions, being knocked out by Rangers in both domestic cups and being knocked out by eventual cup winners Paris Saint-Germain in the Cup Winners' Cup.

Squad

Left club during season

Transfers

Players in

Players out

Competitions

Scottish Premier Division

League table

Matches

Scottish Cup

Scottish League Cup

Cup Winners' Cup

References

Celtic F.C. seasons
Celtic F.C.